The Repin culture was a 4th millennium BCE Eneolithic archaeological culture located in the Pontic–Caspian steppe and East European forest steppe. It developed from preceding local Neolithic cultures, and later developed into the Yamnaya culture. The economy was based on pastoralism, supplemented by hunting. This culture is sometimes classified as an earlier phase of the Yamnaya culture.

Origins and classification

The Repin culture is dated, based on radiocarbon dating of pottery shards, to 3900–3300 calibrated ВСE. According to David Anthony it probably originated in the lower Don region. The Repin culture was neighboured by the Deriivka and Kvityana cultures to the west, and the Konstantinovka culture to the south.

Some scholars consider Repin to be an early stage of the Yamnaya culture, while others have more recently preferred to classify Repin as a distinct Eneolithic culture.

According to A.T. Sinyuk, the Repin culture developed from the preceding local Neolithic cultures. Sinyuk states that the (pre-Corded Ware) Sredny Stog I and Neolithic lower Don cultures are fundamental components in the formation of the Repin culture. Sinyuk and Yuri Rassamakin suggest that the origins of the Repin culture are not connected with the Khvalynsk culture. In contrast, Nina Morgunova and Mikhail Turetskij argue that
cultural continuity between the Yamnaya, Repin, Khvalynsk, and Sredny Stog cultures is demonstrated by the funerary rites and pottery styles.

Rassamakin argues that "there is no longer good support for the simple and attractive idea of a direct evolution of Eneolithic cultures beginning with the Samara and ending with the formation of the Yamnaya culture in the Volga-Ural interfluve. It is no longer accepted by the majority of researchers."

Sites

Repin
At the site, 55% of osseous material was horse bones, 18% cattle, 9% sheep or goat, 9% pigs, and 9% red deer.. This suggests that horse meat was the most important part of the diet here.

Kyzyl Khak 

A Repin antelope hunters' camp, occupied between c. 3700–3600 BCE, situated on the lower Volga. The osseous material here comprises 62% saiga antelope, 13% cattle, 9% sheep, 7% horses, and 7% onagers.

Turganik

From the Repin horizon at Turganik, Tashlinsky District, 2,000 pottery fragments from over 50 vessels have been excavated. Pottery styles and technology indicate cultural links with contemporary North Caspian and Don cultures. Evidence for metallurgy include copper ore finds, stone molds for casting copper, tools, and an ornament. Copper was sourced from local copper deposits. Animal bones are mainly domestic animals, including cattle, dog, and horse, with occasional wild animal bones such as moose, beaver, wild goat, bear, and fox. Fish bones are very rare at this site. The horse finds are considered significant as the region is one of the first places where horse domestication is thought to have occurred.

Pottery
The pottery of the Repin culture is characterised by tall vessels with profiled necks and rounded or flat bottoms, made with silt or a mixture of clay and silt, with some addition of crushed shells and organic material. The surfaces are smoothed and decorated with comb impressions. Vessels are made using molds. The pottery style combines features from nearby regional Eneolithic styles, and exhibits technological continuity with other Eneolithic steppe cultures, suggesting cultural integration and mixing that preceded the development of the Yamnaya culture proper.

The ceramic technology of the Repin culture is argued to be evidence of continuity with the earlier Khvalynsk culture.

Repin pottery type is sometimes found in the cultural layer below Yamnaya pottery, and some early Yamnaya pottery is said to be indistinguishable from the Repin type.  Repin pottery has also been described as very similar to that of Sredny Stog II, while sharing almost no features with that of the Dereivka culture.

Funerary rites

Skeletons are buried in crouched supine position with bent legs to the left or to the right, with the head in the east, sprinkled with ochre, with multiple burials in flat graves. As the Repin period progresses and expands from the original middle Don region, individual burials under a tumulus, sometimes with cromlechs, become more widespread.

Economy

Livelihood was probably based on a combination of pastoralism and hunting. Evidence from Repin sites suggests that animal breeding was the main form of subsistence, with domestic animal bones comprising 80% of the  osseous material. The proportion of domesticated species was typical of nomadic pastoralist societies.

David Anthony suggests that the Repin culture may have specialized in horse breeding for export to the north Caucasus region.

Finds demonstrate a relatively advanced regional tradition of metallurgy, based on extracting copper from local Kargala sandstone, which remained the main source of copper in the later Yamnaya culture.

Rassamakin states that the people of this culture lived a more settled life in the forest-steppe ecotone region, and a more nomadic lifestyle in the steppe zone.

Settlements in the Repin period were of limited number and temporary. Cattle herding gradually became more nomadic over time.

Rassamakin states that the economy of the Repin culture probably resembled that of the Deriivka culture.

Expansion

Anthony suggests that the Afanasievo culture was formed by a migration of people with a material culture of the same type as Repin, probably from the middle Volga-Ural area c. 3700–3500 BCE.

During its second phase the Repin culture had expanded to occupy the Volga, Dnieper and lower Don regions. Yuri Rassamakin suggests that the dispersal of the Repin culture to the south, south east, and south west at the end of the Eneolithic contributed to the formation of the Yamnaya culture. Trifonov considers this dispersal to be a colonization. According to Anthony, elements of Repin culture are found over a wide area at sites that precede early Yamnaya settlements.

The Repin culture is regarded by many archaeologists as an early stage of the Yamnaya culture. Viktor Trifonov, for example, states that the development of the Yamnaya culture is simply the expansion of the Repin culture to the steppe. Rassamakin however argues that Repin was only involved in the formation of the Gorodtsov culture, a late local subgroup of Yamnaya.

Language

David Anthony speculates that people of the Repin culture may have spoken a dialect of early Proto-Indo-European. He also proposes that the Afanasievo separation from the Repin culture represents the separation of pre-Tocharian from early Proto-Indo-European.

References

Sources

Indo-European archaeological cultures
Archaeological cultures of Eastern Europe
Chalcolithic cultures of Europe
Archaeological cultures in Ukraine
Archaeological cultures in Russia
4th millennium BC
Prehistoric Russia